Guy Distad is an American television director. He worked on Lab Rats as first assistant director and he has directed three episodes as of 2013.

He began in 1989 as production assistant on Roseanne and became assistant in 1990, he left in 1993. He has worked as first assistant director on Wizards of Waverly Place and directed seven episodes of the show before it ended in 2012. He also directed numerous episodes of My Wife and Kids from 2003 to 2005.

References

External links

American television directors
Living people
Place of birth missing (living people)
Year of birth missing (living people)